Epipremnum giganteum is a species of flowering plant in the genus Epipremnum.

Description 
It is known for its large stems and leaves. Leaves are characterized by leathery texture, oblong leaves, and prominent striate venation. The plant is known to flower regularly compared to other Epipremnum species; inflorescences are deep golden yellow and solitary.

Native distribution 
It is native to Myanmar, Cambodia, Vietnam, Thailand, peninsular Malaysia, and Singapore.

References

giganteum